Mitchell Krueger was the defending champion but lost in the first round to Keegan Smith.

Michael Mmoh won the title after defeating Dominik Koepfer 7–5, 6–3 in the final.

Seeds

Draw

Finals

Top half

Bottom half

References

External links
Main draw
Qualifying draw

Cary Challenger - 1
2022 Singles